The House of Bernarda Alba is a 1982 Mexican film directed by Gustavo Alatriste.

External links
 

1982 films
Mexican drama films
1980s Spanish-language films
Films directed by Gustavo Alatriste
1980s Mexican films